Jack Buckley (born 17 December 1997) is an Australian rules footballer who plays for the Greater Western Sydney Football Club in the Australian Football League (AFL). He was selected by the Greater Western Sydney Football Club as a Category B rookie from the NSW zone in 2017. He is the son of former Australian rules footballer and current chairman of the North Melbourne Football Club, Ben Buckley.

Early football
Buckley played junior football for the Maroubra Saints, where he played in their Under 16 division's premiership. Buckley played for the UNSW-Eastern Suburbs Bulldogs in the Sydney AFL league. He was recruited as a part of the 's academy team at the age of 12, but quit 3 years later at the age of 15 after he found the academy 'too intense'. In the 8th round of his 2017 season with the Bulldogs, he won the league's rising star nomination after kicking four goals in his team's win.

AFL career
Despite being signed as a Category B rookie in late 2017, Buckley did not debut for the Giants until late into the 2020 AFL season. On debut, Buckley collected 12 disposals, 3 marks, 3 tackles and a clearance. Buckley was upgraded from the rookie list at the conclusion of the season.

Statistics
 Statistics are correct to the end of 2020

|- style="background-color: #eaeaea"
! scope="row" style="text-align:center" | 2018
|  || 44 || 0 || — || — || — || — || — || — || — || — || — || — || — || — || — || —
|-
! scope="row" style="text-align:center" | 2019
|  || 44 || 0 || — || — || — || — || — || — || — || — || — || — || — || — || — || —
|- style="background-color: #EAEAEA"
! scope="row" style="text-align:center" | 2020
|style="text-align:center;"|
| 44 || 2 || 0 || 0 || 11 || 8 || 19 || 7 || 5 || 0.0 || 0.0 || 5.5 || 4.0 || 9.5 || 3.5 || 2.5
|- style="background:#EAEAEA; font-weight:bold; width:2em"
| scope="row" text-align:center class="sortbottom" colspan=3 | Career
| 2
| 0
| 0
| 11
| 8
| 19
| 7
| 5
| 0.0
| 0.0
| 5.5
| 4.0
| 9.5
| 3.5
| 2.5
|}

References

External links

1997 births
Living people
Greater Western Sydney Giants players
Australian rules footballers from New South Wales
UNSW-Eastern Suburbs Bulldogs players